Elisabeth Rodermund, known as Lisa Middelhauve (born Elisabeth Schaphaus on 28 November 1980) is a German musician, better known as the former lead vocalist and pianist (on the earliest works) of German symphonic metal band Xandria from early 2000, until April 2008, but returned as their singer in 2010, only to finish the remaining live shows due to their second lead vocalist, Kerstin Bischof's departure.

After Xandria, in late 2010, Lisa Middelhauve was the guest singer for some shows of the French philharmonic metal band Whyzdom. And as well, she joined the Austrian symphonic metal band Serenity for several shows and the whole European tour 2011 with Delain.

Early life
By the time she was 3-years-old she began playing the keyboard. In 1986, she received violin lessons, called "Mozartine". In 1990, her violin teacher  found Lisa to be very talented, but in 1994 only to appealed to be "hopeless" on the violin and quit. But Lisa remained faithful to the piano and wrote songs about failed relationships at the age of 13 years. A year later, she decided to sing in the opera believing it would not be that difficult, but she departed from the opera going for a more rock oriented technique.

Musical career

With Xandria (2000–2008; 2010) 

Between 1998 and 2000, Lisa participated in a crazy party at the Irish Pub, until she was discovered by Marco. It was her biggest desire to join with Xandria, even before their debut album.

Lisa co-wrote lyrics throughout her whole career with Xandria and as well performed on the piano on the earliest works.

In April 2008, Middelhauve left the band, citing personal reasons and discomfort at being the band's front woman, which was announced weeks later when Lisa had already left the band on their last tour with her.

However, after replacement singer Kerstin Bischof left the band, she agreed to return for several concerts in spring 2010. The band stated Middelhauve will not enter the band again.

Solo work (2009–2012)

Following her departure, Lisa had begun writing and recording material for her future solo album. Many demos were released through YouTube on how they would sound. But Lisa put her solo work on hold in 2010 when the remaining members of Xandria asked Lisa to come back to finish the remaining live shows after their singer, Kerstin Bischof also had left the band.

In 2012, she announced through her Facebook, that she had returned to the studio to finish the process of releasing her solo material, and had released some previews on her SoundCloud account. However, in a 2016 Facebook post, she stated that she had no idea if she was ever going to perform on stage or record music again.

Personal life
In August 2005, Lisa married bandmate Nils Middelhauve, the bassist for Xandria at the time. On 16 December 2013 Lisa announced via Facebook that she and her husband had divorced. Some years later, she announced that she's married her new partner and will be named Elisabeth Rodermund from now. Her daughter was born in January 2018.

Discography

with Xandria 
Demos:
 Kill the Sun (2000)

Albums:
 Kill the Sun (3 May 2003)
 Ravenheart (24 May 2004)
 India (22 August 2005)
 Salomé - The Seventh Veil (25 May 2007)
 Now & Forever - Best of Xandria (6 June 2008)

Singles:
 "Ravenheart" (2004)
 "Eversleeping" (2004)
 "Save My Life" (2007)

Promo singles:
 "Kill the Sun" (2003)
 "In Love With the Darkness" (2005)
 "Sisters of the Light" (2007) as Xandria vs. Jesus on Extasy

External links

References 

1980 births
English-language singers from Germany
Women heavy metal singers
German heavy metal singers
German women singer-songwriters
Living people
German mezzo-sopranos
Musicians from Bielefeld
20th-century German women singers
21st-century German women singers